Thylactus lettowvorbecki is a species of beetle in the family Cerambycidae. It was described by Kriesche in 1924, originally published as "Thylactus lettow-vorbecki". It is known from Tanzania.

References

Endemic fauna of Tanzania
Xylorhizini
Beetles described in 1924